The Viscounts were an American pop group from New Jersey, formed in 1958. They had one hit single, with Earle Hagen's instrumental classic "Harlem Nocturne" in 1959, which peaked at #52 in the U.S. Billboard Hot 100 chart in early 1960; it was re-released in 1965 and hit #39 the second time around.  The single and album of the same title were originally recorded for the Madison label,  then both were reissued in 1965 on the Amy label, the Amy LP having a slightly different track listing than the Madison release.

Members
Harry Haller - saxophone
Bobby Spievak - lead guitar
Joe Spievak - bass guitar (March 13, 1936 - February 22, 2020)
Larry Vecchio - electronic organ, piano (June 12, 1935 - January 10, 2013)
Clark Smith - drums
William “Billy” Slavis - guitar (June 16, 1947 - January 1, 1975)

Discography

Singles

Albums
The Viscounts -- Madison 1001 -- 1960
Harlem Nocturne -- Amy 8008 -- 1965

References

Musical groups from New Jersey